Legislative elections were held in Portuguese Macau on 15 August 1988, returning 17 members of the Legislative Assembly of Macau, with six directly elected by electorates, six indirectly elected by special interest groups and five appointed by the Governor.

Following the political deadlock between the conservatives led by Carlos d'Assumpção and Almeida e Costa, Governor of Macau, the Legislative Assembly was dissolved on 27 January 1984 by Ramalho Eanes, President of Portugal, under the request by the Governor. The unprecedented move, reacted strongly within the Macanese society, triggered the election and allowed new voter registration, which the Governor hoped to expand the electorate base.

The voting began at 8 am local time and ended at 8 pm. Queues were seen especially in morning and at night. With nearly 30,000 voting, the turnout was at around 60% (media report in Hong Kong gave near figures at 60% or 55%). Majority of the 6 directly elected seats, elected through D'Hondt method, were won by the Electoral Union, which consisted of pro-Beijing Chinese and Macau-born Portuguese with some from the Association for the Defense of Macau Interests (ADIM), and therefore retained their influence in the city. Five of the indirectly elected seats were uncontested, while the remaining seat for Welfare, Culture, Education constituency was competed between three candidates.

Governor then appointed five other members to the Legislative Assembly, ensuring the control of Portuguese in the parliament.

Results

Members

References 

Macau
Legislative
Elections in Macau
Macau